Waipathe is a village in Ye Township in Mawlamyine District in the Mon State of south-east Myanmar.

Notes

External links
 "Waipathe Map — Satellite Images of Waipathe" Maplandia World Gazetteer

Populated places in Mon State